The 2021–22 Morgan State Bears men's basketball team represented Morgan State University in the 2021–22 NCAA Division I men's basketball season. The Bears, led by third-year head coach Kevin Broadus, played their home games at Talmadge L. Hill Field House in Baltimore, Maryland as members of the Mid-Eastern Athletic Conference.

Previous season
The Bears finished the 2020–21 season 14–8, 7–5 in MEAC play to finish in third place in the Northern Division. In the MEAC tournament, they defeated Florida A&M in the quarterfinals, Coppin State in the semifinals, to advance to the championship game. In the title game, they would lose to Norfolk State.

Roster

Schedule and results

|-
!colspan=12 style=| Non-conference regular season

|-
!colspan=12 style=| MEAC regular season

|-
!colspan=9 style=| MEAC tournament

|-
!colspan=9 style=| The Basketball Classic

Sources

References

Morgan State Bears men's basketball seasons
Morgan State Bears
Morgan State Bears men's basketball
Morgan State Bears men's basketball
Morgan State